Black Grace is one of New Zealand's leading contemporary dance companies. Founded by Neil Ieremia in 1995, Ieremia draws from his Samoan and New Zealand roots to create innovative dance works that reach across social, cultural and generational barriers. Since its inception, Black Grace has changed the face of contemporary dance in Aotearoa, New Zealand. The work itself is highly physical, rich in the storytelling traditions of the South Pacific and expressed with raw finesse, unique beauty and power.

History 
In 1995, Neil Ieremia formed Black Grace Dance Company, debuting with a record-breaking season at Auckland's Maidment Theatre. Black Grace was initially made up of ten male dancers of Pacific, Māori and New Zealand heritage and stayed a strictly all-male Company until 2001. After working for various New Zealand choreographers, Ieremia wanted to orchestrate an environment where he and his Company members could have a ‘clean’ environment to create in - meaning this group of men, many of whom had been friends since childhood, could feel relaxed and honest.

In 2002, Ieremia debuted a production brand called Black Grace & Friends, where guest choreographers or senior Company members were invited to create short works on the Company. It was when a guest choreographer pulled out of the project at the last minute, that Ieremia had to step in to complete the programme, when he had the idea for a work titled Human Language. This was the first work that Ieremia choreographed for Black Grace that included women in the cast. Up until this point, Ieremia had only allowed females to participate in youth projects that Black Grace facilitated. “Having some very good young women in the company changed the possibilities and creativity, they offered so much more. Men come to training late and the women often had early ballet training and having that to work with as a choreographer really opened things up.” (Ieremia, 2015)

In 2004 Black Grace was invited to perform at Jacob's Pillow in the USA, they were the first New Zealand company to ever receive an invitation. The invitation to perform at Jacob’s Pillow catapulted Neil Ieremia as a choreographer and Black Grace into the highly competitive American market and the international stage. Since then, Black Grace has become one of New Zealand’s most successful cultural exports, performing Ieremia’s choreography in Australia, Canada, Germany, Holland, France, Japan, Luxembourg, Mexico, New Caledonia, South Korea, Switzerland and the United States of America. Among the company’s international highlights are sell-out performances at Jacob’s Pillow Dance Festival in Massachusetts and a four-week season on New York City’s 42nd Street, as well as performances at Mexico’s renowned Cervantino Festival, Washington D.C.’s John F. Kennedy Center for the Performing Arts, and the 2010 Cultural Olympiad in Vancouver.

Name 
The name Black Grace combines a word that in New Zealand is slang for daring and bravery with a quality not attributed to men. Neil Ieremia explains that “the word ‘black’ is a word we used to describe each other at high school. But it was a positive term. So, if you’d been impressed by something your mate had done, like, ask the prettiest girl out on a date, you might say, “gee, bro, you’re black”, and that was a compliment. We were taking a word that had been used in a negative way, and we were giving it a different meaning. Brave, bold, it’s not really a reference to colour at all. And, as for ‘grace’, that’s something my ballet teacher used to tell me that I lacked. She kept saying, “you need more grace, you need more grace!”. When I first coined the name, “Black Grace”, everyone hated it, so that’s why I chose it. That’s what we are as a company, as an entity, we go against the grain. It’s doing something that other people think is stupid or foolhardy. That’s what Black Grace means. It’s a mission statement.” (Ieremia, 2018)

Artistic director 
Founding Artistic Director Neil Ieremia, ONZM, is one of New Zealand’s most accomplished choreographers, a creative entrepreneur and inspirational leader. Born and bred in Cannons Creek, Porirua, Ieremia was raised in a tough working-class neighbourhood located to the North East of Wellington, in a country focused more on its sporting prowess than creative expression. At 19, and with no formal training, Ieremia left his job working in a bank and packed up his life in Porirua to move to Auckland to attend the Auckland Performing Arts School where he experienced his first ballet and contemporary classes. In his final year at the Auckland Performing Arts School he joined the acclaimed Douglas Wright Dance Company and subsequently worked with many of New Zealand's leading choreographers. Neil Ieremia founded Black Grace in 1995 and it is still recognised as New Zealand’s leading contemporary dance company.

Ieremia’s other achievements include choreographing works for the NZ Opera, Royal NZ Ballet and the NZ Symphony Orchestra. In 2018 he authored a children's book, Elephantic, and founded and directed a free festival for Pacific artists, The Guerrilla Collection.

Awards and honours 
In 2003, Ieremia was nominated for the Rolex Mentor and Protégé Arts Initiative. In 2005, The Arts Foundation of New Zealand made him an Arts Laureate, and in 2009 he received the Paul D. Fleck Fellowship in the Arts from The Banff Centre, Canada. In 2009, the Guam Legislature passed a resolution in recognition of Black Grace’s work with local communities there, and in 2010 the Mayor of Honolulu officially proclaimed 6 February 2010 as “Black Grace Day”. The Company received a Herald Angel Award at the 2014 Edinburgh Festival Fringe.  In 2015, Ieremia received a City of Porirua Anniversary Award and the Senior Pacific Artist Award from Creative New Zealand. In 2016, he was appointed an Officer of the New Zealand Order of Merit for services to dance and in 2021, he was a recipient of a Kea World Class Award, and was inducted into the Porirua Hall of Fame.
In 2022 Neil Ieremia and Black Grace received the inaugural Moana Creative Enterprise Award at the 2022 Pacific Business Trust Awards.

Works

Filmography 

 2005 From Cannon’s Creek to Jacob’s Pillow. Documentary - Aileen O'Sullivan and Toby Mills
 2013 Mother Mother. Music Video - Fat Freddy’s Drop
 2021 Elephantic. Short dance film based on the book Elephantic authored by Neil Ieremia and illustrated by Pati Fuiava.

Education 
Neil Ieremia has provided multiple education opportunities through Black Grace for young dancers including the Black Grace Dancer Development Programme, UrbanYOUTHMovement, school workshops and a Black Grace Educational Resource.

Reviews 
“Neil Ieremia has spread his artistic roots in several rich pasts and grown up and out into a sunlight of his own making.” - New York Times, 2004. Retrieved from https://www.nytimes.com/2004/08/16/arts/dance-review-new-zealand-company-breaks-out-and-soars.html

“The distinguishing spirit of this dance troupe, directed by Neil Ieremia, is an exhilarating, seemingly inexhaustible energy.” - New York Times, 2019. Retrieved from https://www.nytimes.com/2019/10/31/arts/dance/black-grace-review.html

"…Black Grace crosses geographical and social boundaries, often with innovative flair and theatricality… It packs the raw visceral power of a primal communal rite into a carefully constructed form of rigor and sophistication." – The Boston Globe, 2019. Retrieved from https://www.bostonglobe.com/arts/2019/10/27/black-grace-kiona-and-little-bird-suite-takes-flight/Mv5CLcJpK43oVKM8quVWQL/story.html 

“Black Grace is an aesthetic delight, it is even more so an elemental experience of the magic of rhythm.” - Badische Zeitung, Germany, 2012. Retrieved from https://www.badische-zeitung.de/sonntag-tanz-black-grace--56634015.html

“Phenomenal strength, stamina and spirit” - The New Zealand Herald, 2015. Retrieved from https://www.nzherald.co.nz/entertainment/dance-review-siva-black-grace/V5O66UDSTUMN57OEAMAJGC64TM/ 

“There is deep emotion in Black Grace’s repertoire that is worth seeing, if the company happens to visit your neck of the woods.” - Critical Dance, 2017. Retrieved from https://criticaldance.org/black-grace/ 

“Neil Ieremia, Black Grace’s Artistic Director, has the necessary choreographic skill to shape movement that can reflect the complexity of Bach’s polyphony.  Mark Morris possesses a similar finesse with music and dance, though Ieremia was not afraid to add concept and imagery to his exploration of the score.  The movement and the music were compelling in their own right, yet Ieremia surpassed his peers by adding a narrative dimension.” - Ballet-Dance Magazine, Virginia, 2010. Retrieved from http://www.heatherdance.com/2010/03/

References

Bibliography 
Acquista, C. (2019, October).

Neil Ieremia: The Grace of Resilience. Dance ICONS. Retrieved from http://www.danceicons.org/pages/?p=190927091519

Foyer, M. (2015, November 2).

Neil Ieremia: A man on a mission and with stories to tell. CriticalDance. Retrieved from https://criticaldance.org/neil-ieremia/ 

Husband, D. (2018, May 13)

Neil Ieremia: Telling  our stories through dance, E. Tangata. Retrieved from https://e-tangata.co.nz/korero/neil-ieremia-telling-our-stories-through-dance/  

Laguna Dance Festival (2019).

Black Grace. Retrieved from https://lagunadancefestival.org/project/black-grace/

Smitch, C. (2008, March 27).

Black Grace notes. Retrieved from

https://archive.today/20080517003216/http://www.santafenewmexican.com/Pasatiempo/Black-Grace-notes#selection-1003.45-1003.366

Documentary

O’Sullivan, A. and Mills T. (2005).

Black Grace - From Cannon’s Creek to Joacob’s Pillow.

Retrieved from https://www.nzonscreen.com/title/black-grace-2005

External links 
Archive film of Black Grace performing Minoi in 2004 at Jacob's Pillow

1995 establishments in New Zealand
Arts in New Zealand
Māori culture in Auckland
Culture in Auckland
Modern dance companies
Dance companies in New Zealand
Contemporary dance